Kevin Painter (born 12 July 1967) is an English retired darts player, known as "The Artist". He is arguably most famous for finishing as the runner-up to Phil Taylor in the 2004 PDC World Championship final, now widely credited as one of the greatest televised matches in the history of the sport. He was also the winner of the Players Championship Finals in 2011.

Darts career

BDO
Painter started playing darts around the age of 17. His first County Appearance was against Staffordshire for Essex at the Runnymede Hall, Benfleet on Saturday 15 November as a Men's B Team player, where he won 2–0 in 16 and 21 darts, recording an average of 27.08 (81.24) Once an Essex county player, his first appearance on television was in the 1994 BDO World Championship, which was notable as the first BDO World Championship to follow the split in darts, where 16 players formed the World Darts Council (later Professional Darts Corporation) and their own world championship. Painter was defeated in the first round 3–2 by Kevin Kenny. During that year (1994) he also appeared on TV's Bullseye and won the pro's Bronze Bully for that year with a score of 380 (doubled up to £760 for charity). He reached the second round of the 1995 championship before falling 3–0 to Martin Adams, but success followed later in 1995 with a win in the inaugural England Open and in 1997 he won the prestigious British Open. Two more appearances in the second round of the BDO World Championship followed and in the 2000 championship he reached his first televised quarter-final, but lost 5–2 to the eventual champion Ted Hankey.

The new millennium marked more success for Painter with victory in the Swedish Open. Only a month earlier he had made his debut in a PDC event – the 2000 World Grand Prix where he reached the second round, but was defeated 3–2 by Taylor. Painter however did not become a member of the Professional Dart Players Association, the organisation that allows players to play in all PDC events, and therefore remained a BDO player. In what would be his final appearance in the event, Painter once again reached the quarter-finals in the 2001 BDO World Championship before losing 5–2 to Andy Fordham. Painter entered another PDC event, the 2001 World Matchplay, but lost in the first round before returning again in the 2001 World Grand Prix, where in a major shock he defeated Taylor in the first round. Taylor had never before been defeated in this event and had not lost on television for two years prior to this loss. This was also the first time that Taylor had been defeated in the first round of a televised PDC event. Painter reached the quarter-finals before losing 6–1 to Dennis Smith. Back in the BDO he made his best performance in the 2001 Winmau World Masters, reaching the quarter-finals and repeated that placing in the 2001 Zuiderduin Masters, in what was his last BDO event.

PDC

2001–2004: Early success
Painter made his debut in the PDC World Championship in the 2002 event but lost in the first round to Ronnie Baxter. Despite a victory in the 2002 Bob Anderson Classic, he failed to make any real headway in the televised PDC events until he reached his first world championship semi-final in the 2003 PDC World Championship, where he lost 6–4 to eventual champion John Part.

Painter's finest hour came in the 2004 World Championship. As the 10th seed, he began his campaign by beating Paul Williams before he defeated 7th seed Baxter in the fourth round. He then beat Mark Dudbridge before a whitewash of former world champion Bob Anderson followed later on in the semi-finals. Painter then met top seed Taylor in the final. What followed was the longest televised darts match ever and for a time the most watched PDC darts match (820,000 viewers) until the 2007 final. Despite Painter leading 4–1 at one point, the match went to 6–6 in sets and 5–5 in legs in the final set, so a sudden-death leg was needed to decide a winner. Taylor won it and became the champion, but Painter, who had a three-dart out-shot to win the championship at 2–1 and 3–2 in the final set, while also leaving himself double 16 at 4–3 in the final set without ever getting a dart at it, gained fame for his participation in such an epic final.

The following year was a strong one for Painter where he reached the quarter-finals in the UK Open and the semi-finals in the Las Vegas Desert Classic, his best performance in these tournaments to date. He reached the quarter-finals of the 2005 Las Vegas Desert Classic and the 2005 World Championship despite falling victim to a leg injury which damaged his form and kept him out of many tournaments.

2006–2007: Decline
Painter's form dropped substantially in 2006. Despite opening strongly with a victory in the North West UK Open final and a second successive appearance in the quarter-finals of the 2006 World Championship, his form began to stagnate around the middle of the year. Painter suffered first or early round defeats in most of the major tournaments and his ranking had dropped to 18 by the beginning of 2007. This was exacerbated by a defeat in the first round of that year's World Championship to his former practice partner Colin Osborne.

The first half of 2007 saw the early round defeats in televised majors continue, though many of them were to Taylor and then-World Champion Raymond van Barneveld. Painter suffered another first round loss in the 2007 World Grand Prix, but this would prove to be the turning point. Sky Sports pundit and friend Rod Harrington warned that Painter could "slip into anonymity" if he did not recover his form. Painter attributed the "perception that he was finished" to a renewed determination and subsequent rise in form.

2007–2010: Resurgence
November 2007 saw a strong return to form for Painter, where he reached the quarter-finals of the first Grand Slam of Darts despite being entered as a wild card. The 2008 World Championship proved to be a monumental success for Painter, where he was responsible for knocking out defending champion Raymond van Barneveld in the last 16. Painter was knocked out in the semi-finals by eventual champion Part, his best performance since when he was the runner-up in 2004. Painter considers the win over van Barneveld as the greatest of his career.

Painter's results in the televised majors in 2008 were not as might have been expected from the World Championship – he was once again defeated by Osborne in the third round of the UK Open and lost in the first round of the Las Vegas Desert Classic against the eventual champion Taylor. Painter averaged 104 (the third highest average of the tournament) and did not miss a double in the match, but was still defeated 6–4. His poor record at the World Matchplay continued as he suffered a first round loss in the 2008 event to Tony Eccles. He lost in a deciding leg to Colin Lloyd in the second round of the World Grand Prix (having missed three darts to win the match) and finished bottom of his group in the 2008 Grand Slam of Darts. However, his success in non-televised events was considerably better including an appearance in the Bristol Players Championship final – losing 3–2 to Dennis Priestley. This was his first PDC final since September 2006.

Painter entered the 2009 PDC World Championship as the number 17 seed. He defeated Matt Clark in the first round, winning in a sudden-death leg to become the first seeded player to progress to the second round, where he beat Carlos Rodríguez. However, in the third round he lost 4–1 to eventual champion Taylor. In the inaugural Players Championship Finals at the end of January, Painter looked to be heading for another first round exit as he went 5–2 down to Alex Roy, but he won four consecutive legs to progress to the second round, where he met second seed James Wade. This match also went to a deciding leg; Painter missed one dart at the bullseye and Wade took his chance to go through at Painter's expense. However, this performance saw Painter re-establish his place in the top 16 of the rankings, and his good form in floor events from 2008 continued – he reached two semi-finals on the PDC Pro Tour, notably in Gladbeck, Germany, where on 1 March he led Taylor 5–4 before losing 6–5.

In June 2009, Painter reached the semi-finals of the UK Open, his best ever performance in the tournament. After dispatching Dennis Priestley 9–3 and Alan Tabern 10–8, Painter eventually lost 10–7 to Colin Osborne. His World Matchplay woes continued with a 13–3 defeat to Taylor in the second round of the 2009 event, though he reached the quarter-finals of the World Grand Prix and the Grand Slam of Darts, in the latter topping the 'group of death' that included Raymond van Barneveld and John Part. Another third round exit followed in the 2010 World Championship, 4–1 to van Barneveld this time.

Painter's first televised appearance in 2010 was a third round defeat at the UK Open, where he was on the end of a 9–0 whitewash by Taylor, who recorded the current world record average at 118.66. But success was to follow in the 2010 World Matchplay; after making a remarkable comeback to come from 8–2 down in defeating Essex rival Colin Lloyd 11–9 in the first round, he overcame Mark Walsh 14–12 to reach the quarter-finals of the World Matchplay at the tenth time of asking. Once again however, eternal rival Taylor brought his run to an end in the semi-finals.

2011–2021: First major win
Initially Painter suffered an indifferent 2011. At the 2011 PDC World Championship, he was defeated soundly in the first round by Brendan Dolan. At the 2011 World Matchplay, Painter revealed that he had received laser eye surgery before the tournament to improve his game, he also stated that he had hit a nine dart finish after 10 minutes of practise with his improved vision. However, in the opening night of the tournament, he led reigning world champion Adrian Lewis for most of the match, but missed six doubles that would have won him the match, and subsequently lost by 14 legs to 12.

At the Players Championship Finals in December 2011, Painter beat Colin Osborne, Gary Anderson, Mervyn King, and Scott Rand to reach his first major final since the World Championship in 2004. The victory against Rand saw him recover from 9–6 down in the best-of-19 leg match and survive two match darts in the seventeenth leg. Painter then beat Mark Webster 13–9 in the final to win his first televised major tournament. This victory returned him to the top 10 in the PDC Order of Merit for the first time since 2006. At the 2012 PDC World Championship, Painter defeated Arron Monk and Mark Walsh before losing once again to John Part by four sets to two.

Painter's Players Championship victory saw him gain a PDC wildcard into the Premier League Darts for the first time. He won his first game with an 8–6 win over Gary Anderson, despite averaging 82.67. Painter also had wins over Simon Whitlock, Andy Hamilton, and Adrian Lewis, but finished 7th in the 8 man league. At the World Matchplay, Painter suffered a 6–10 defeat to Steve Beaton in the first round. In October, Painter defeated Kim Huybrechts 2–0 in sets in the first round of the World Grand Prix without his opponent picking up a single leg, but then lost to Justin Pipe 2–3 in the last 16. Painter won two of his three Group C games at the Grand Slam of Darts to finish second in the table and qualify for the knockout stage, where he faced Mervyn King. From 2–2, Painter surged away by taking five straight legs and closed out the match 10–5, but then missed 30 of his 42 attempts at a double in the quarter-finals against Dean Winstanley as he lost 12–16. Painter finished 30th on the ProTour Order of Merit, just inside the top 32 who qualified for the Players Championship Finals. He began the defence of his 2011 title with a first round meeting against Michael van Gerwen, who had won eight tournaments this year, and lost 3–6.

At the 2013 World Championship, Painter lost in the last 16 to Adrian Lewis 4–2. He produced a superb fightback from 7–3 down in the fourth round of the UK Open to beat Gary Anderson 9–7. At 5–0 down to Adrian Lewis in the next round, Painter threatened another amazing comeback as at one point he trailed only 4–6, but he would ultimately lose 9–4. He was knocked out in the second round of the European Championship, World Matchplay and World Grand Prix.
In October, Painter made it through to his first PDC ranking final since his major success almost two years ago at the 12th Players Championship of the season. From the last 16 onwards he defeated Robert Thornton, Wes Newton and Michael Smith, but was whitewashed 6–0 by Kim Huybrechts in the final.

Painter advanced to the third round of the 2014 World Championship without dropping a set but then hit just 19% of his doubles against Simon Whitlock to lose 4–0.
At the UK Open he enjoyed comfortable wins over Richie Burnett, Andrew Gilding and Dean Winstanley and led Mervyn King 2–0 in the early stages of their quarter-final, before his form dropped to lose 10–6. His second major quarter-final of the year came at the World Grand Prix which he reached by coming back from 2–0 down in sets against Adrian Lewis to win 3–2. He again fell 2–0 down this time against Gary Anderson, but rallied to pull a setback and then took out a 152 finish with Anderson waiting on 36 for the match to draw level at 2–2. However, Painter would lose the deciding set to fall short of reaching his first semi-final in the event, this being his fifth last eight defeat.

Painter built a 3–1 set advantage over Spanish qualifier Cristo Reyes in the second round of the 2015 World Championship, but lost three sets in a row without getting a match dart to be eliminated 4–3. He suffered a 9–0 whitewash to Andrew Gilding in the third round of the UK Open. Painter missed out on playing in the World Matchplay this year since he switched to the PDC in 2001. He failed to qualify for the rest of the majors on the PDC calendar in 2015, but remained in the top 32 on the Order of Merit to play in the 2016 World Championship.

In the second round of the 2016 World Championship, Painter missed four darts to lead Phil Taylor 2–1 and went on to be defeated 4–1.
2016 proved to be the first year since Painter's switch to the PDC that he did not reach the quarter-finals of any event. Painter dropped out of the top 32 in the world rankings during the year and qualified for two other major events, the UK Open (lost 6–4 to Dean Winstanley in the second round) and the Players Championship Finals (lost 6–4 to Dave Chisnall in the first round).

Painter qualified for the 2017 World Championship through the Pro Tour Order of Merit when Kyle Anderson was forced to withdraw from the event due to being unable to get a UK Visa. He won the last six legs of his first round encounter with Jamie Caven to defeat him 3–1. He missed a number of doubles in his second round match with Phil Taylor, including three to win the third set, and was defeated 4–0.

Painter qualified via the Pro Tour Order of Merit for the 2018 World Championship, but lost in the first round to Mensur Suljović 3–0.

In 2018 he did not earn enough money to qualify for another major tournament. Since he lost his tour card in 2019 he is playing on the Challenge Tour.

After failing to regain his tour card in 2021 Q School, Kevin publicly announced his retirement from professional darts after his 25 year career.

Outside of darts
Painter lives in Rugby, Warwickshire. He previously lived with his long-term partner, Janine Gough, and their daughter, Madison Elise Painter (born 2005), until his separation from Gough in 2016. Gough is herself a former darts player from Swansea, and she won the Girls' World Masters in 1999 and 2000. Kevin Painter was a builder before turning professional.  He spends his training sessions with Matthew Edgar, a PDC darts player. He is also a season ticket and share holder of Ipswich Town. He often plays wearing a blue shirt in reference to his favourite team.

In 2012, Painter, together with the seven other players who competed in the Premier League recorded a charity single with Chas Hodges and his band called 'Got My Tickets For The Darts' which was written by Chas. It was released on 18 May, the night after the play-offs at the O2 in London, where it was premiered. Proceeds from the single will be donated to the Haven House Children's Hospice.

Painter has also been featured in numerous darts videogames, including PDC World Championship Darts 2008, 2009 and PDC World Championship Darts Pro Tour.

Controversy
Painter is probably also famous for a notorious rivalry with Taylor, perhaps stemming from his shock victory over Taylor in the 2001 World Grand Prix, and loss in the 2004 World Championship final. He has had many run-ins with Taylor. In the 2005 World Championship quarter-final against Taylor, Painter often tried to check out by hitting the bullseye, but failed many times. Taylor won the last leg of the match by deliberately leaving 50, then checking out on the bull, which Painter took as a taunt and argued viciously with Taylor for a few minutes after the match.

In April 2008, Painter was involved in another incident at the Holland Masters, a non-televised tournament. In a quarter-final match with Taylor's protégé, Adrian Lewis, an argument between the two took place in the deciding set. They were both disqualified from the tournament. In July, the Darts Regulation Authority decided upon an appropriate punishment; Painter was fined £200 and banned for three months with two months suspended while Lewis was fined £400 with a six-month ban, four months suspended.

World Championship results

BDO
1994: First round (lost to Kevin Kenny 2–3)
1995: Second round (lost to Martin Adams 0–3)
1996: First round (lost to Ronnie Baxter 2–3)
1998: Second round (lost to Richie Burnett 1–3)
1999: Second round (lost to Ronnie Baxter 0–3)
2000: Quarter-finals (lost to Ted Hankey 2–5)
2001: Quarter-finals (lost to Andy Fordham 2–5)

PDC

WSDT
 2022: Semi-finals (lost to Robert Thornton 2–4)
 2023: Semi-finals (lost to Robert Thornton 0–3)

Career finals

BDO major finals: 1 (1 title)

PDC major finals: 2 (1 title, 1 runner-up)

Career statistics

(W) Won; (F) finalist; (SF) semifinalist; (QF) quarterfinalist; (#R) rounds 6, 5, 4, 3, 2, 1; (RR) round-robin stage; (Prel.) Preliminary round; (DNQ) Did not qualify; (DNP) Did not participate; (NH) Not held

Performance timeline

References

External links
 Kevin Painter's Official Site

1967 births
Living people
English darts players
Professional Darts Corporation former tour card holders
People from Billericay
People from Daventry
British Darts Organisation players
Sportspeople from Rugby, Warwickshire
Players Championship Finals champions